European  Junior and U23 Weightlifting Championships (European U23 and U20 Weightlifting Championships) is an annual event organised by the European Weightlifting Federation (EWF) for Under 23 and under 20 Weightlifters in Europe. European Championships in junior category were held from 1973 under the name European  Junior  Weightlifting Championships (U20). In 2009 the competitions were held in two cities, European  Junior  Weightlifting Championships in Landskrona and the new European  U23 Weightlifting Championships in Wladyslawowo.  After that year, the competition took the current name.

European Weightlifting Federation (EWF) also have European U17 and U15 Weightlifting Championships (European Youth & U15 Weightlifting Championships) since 1992. last edition was competed in 2022 European Youth & U15 Weightlifting Championships.

Editions
Results:

Medals (2019 - 2021)

Big

Big and Small

See also
 2017 European Youth Weightlifting Championships
 2018 European Youth Weightlifting Championships
 2019 European Youth Weightlifting Championships
 2022 European Youth & U15 Weightlifting Championships

References

External links
 EWF Junior Championships Results 
 EWF U23 Championships Results 
 https://www.halteropedia.fr/resultats-internationaux/championnats-d-europe/europe-junior.html  
 https://www.halteropedia.fr/resultats-internationaux/championnats-d-europe/europe-u23.html
 https://web.archive.org/web/20170713073047/http://www.halteropedia.fr/resultats-internationaux/championnats-d-europe/europe-junior.html (1975-1979 + 1984-2016)
 https://web.archive.org/web/20170713073300/http://www.halteropedia.fr/resultats-internationaux/championnats-d-europe/europe-u23.html (2009-2016)
 http://iwrp.net/ (1990-2019)
 https://www.the-sports.org/weightlifting-european-junior-championships-2022-medals-epa123987.html
 https://www.the-sports.org/weightlifting-european-u-23-championships-2022-medals-epa123988.html
 https://ewf.sport/european-championships-results/ (2013-2022)
 http://result.ewfed.com/  - EWFED Result Database
 http://result.ewfed.com/eventlist?ara=junior 
 http://result.ewfed.com/eventlist?ara=u23 
 https://web.archive.org/web/20220000000000*/http://result.ewfed.com/
 https://web.archive.org/web/20220000000000*/http://result.ewfed.com/eventlist?ara=junior
 https://web.archive.org/web/20220000000000*/http://result.ewfed.com/eventlist?ara=u23
 https://www.iat.uni-leipzig.de/datenbanken/dbgwh/daten.php
 https://www.iat.uni-leipzig.de/datenbanken/dbgwh/kopf.php
 https://www.iat.uni-leipzig.de/datenbanken/dbgwh/daten.php?wkid=5EFF24E1D4564FCAB76E259FA499D1E8&gkl=4

 
Weightlifting competitions
Weightlifting in Europe
European youth sports competitions
Recurring sporting events established in 1973